Wendi Elizabeth Andriano (née Ochoa; born August 6, 1970) is an American female prisoner on death row in Arizona. She was convicted of the 2000 murder of her terminally ill husband, Joe. She is incarcerated at the Lumley Unit in the Arizona State Prison Complex - Perryville. Her inmate number is #191593.

Background
In January 1994, she married Joseph Andriano. Not long into the marriage, Joe fell ill. After many misdiagnoses, Joe was diagnosed with adenoid cystic carcinoma in 1998. By that time, his illness had become terminal. Joe attempted holistic therapies for his illness, but by 2000 had resorted to chemotherapy. By that time, Wendi had given birth to two children and was working as an apartment manager, but she began to resent her increased responsibilities. She began to frequent bars and have affairs. She and her husband solicited a friend to pose as her husband during the life insurance pre-screening processes, although no insurance was ever purchased.

Crime
During the early morning hours of October 8, 2000, Wendi Andriano bludgeoned her 33-year-old husband Joe to death with a bar stool and stabbed him in the neck with a 13-inch knife in the couple's apartment in Ahwatukee, Arizona. His autopsy revealed that he had sustained 23 blows to the skull, and traces of sodium azide were found in his system.

Approximately one hour before Joe's murder, his wife Wendi had called 911 at the behest of a co-worker, claiming that her terminally ill husband was dying. When paramedics arrived, Wendi turned them away, stating that Joe had a do-not-resuscitate order, and that his wish was to die. Paramedics left the scene. One hour later, Wendi called 911 again, reporting that she had stabbed and beaten her husband to death in self-defense. She also made claims that her husband was physically and psychologically abusive toward her. However, being that Joe was weak from chemotherapy and the sodium azide poisoning, he was unable to defend himself. Wendi was charged with murder.

Trial and aftermath
Four years after the crime, on August 23, 2004, Wendi Andriano's murder trial began.  Even though she had no prior criminal record, she faced the death penalty for her crime. Prosecutors stated that Wendi's motive for murdering her husband was money. Evidence was brought up about how Wendi had tried to instate a life insurance policy on her terminally ill husband. In addition, prosecutors alleged that she was tempted by a potentially large yield from a medical malpractice lawsuit filed against Joe's doctors. They attempted to prove that Wendi used a pesticide, sodium azide, to poison her husband to appear as if Joe's death was the result of a heart attack. At the trial, Wendi testified in her own defense. For nine days on the stand, she testified that she had been battered by her husband. She also stated that her husband Joe flew into a rage after she told him about her affair. She said there was a struggle with the knife.  Despite her dramatic testimony, on November 18, 2004, Wendi's jury found her guilty of first-degree murder. A month later came her sentencing. Due to the heinousness, cruelty, and depravity of the crime, and because the crime was financially motivated, she was sentenced to death by lethal injection on December 22, 2004.

Wendi Andriano filed a post-conviction appeal in 2007, claiming that evidence of her affairs and efforts to buy life insurance policies for her ailing husband unfairly prejudiced her in front of the jury. She also claimed that jurors were not allowed to consider lesser charges, such as second-degree murder or manslaughter. Ultimately, her conviction was affirmed by the Arizona Supreme Court in July 2007.

After her direct appeal was over, Andriano's case entered post-conviction relief. For this, her appeals attorneys claimed prosecutor Juan Martinez's emphasis on her affairs ignited female stereotypes and called it "prosecutorial misconduct." The appeal, filed in 2012, has yet to receive an opinion from the Arizona Supreme Court or Maricopa County, as it is not uncommon for the highest state court and the trial county to oversee proceedings in this particular stage. After this level of appeal is over, Andriano could file a habeas corpus appeal. Then if this is denied at federal district court, the appeal will immediately be sent to the 9th Circuit Court of Appeals, the court that handles appeals for this federal district that includes Arizona. After this, the US Supreme Court could hear the case, although this is extremely unlikely. After this, Wendi Andriano will be executed, as by then, her appeals will be over.

As of January 2018, Wendi Andriano is one of three women on Arizona's death row; the other two women are Shawna Forde and Sammantha Allen.

Wendi's case was profiled on the Oxygen Network program Snapped on June 2, 2011, and the Investigation Discovery program Deadly Women on September 9, 2011.

See also
 List of death row inmates in the United States
 List of women on death row in the United States

References

1970 births
2000 murders in the United States
Living people
American people convicted of murder
People convicted of murder by Arizona
American female murderers
American female criminals
American prisoners sentenced to death
Prisoners sentenced to death by Arizona
Women sentenced to death
Mariticides
20th-century American criminals